Ivan  is a Slavic male given name, connected with the variant of the Greek name  (English: John) from Hebrew   meaning 'God is gracious'. It is associated worldwide with Slavic countries. The earliest person known to bear the name was Tsar Ivan Vladislav of Bulgaria.

It is very popular in Russia, Ukraine, Croatia, Serbia, Bosnia and Herzegovina, Slovenia, Bulgaria, Belarus, North Macedonia, and Montenegro and has also become more popular in Romance-speaking countries since the 20th century.

Etymology
Ivan is the common Slavic Latin spelling, while Cyrillic spelling is two-fold: in Bulgarian, Russian, Macedonian, Serbian and Montenegrin it is Иван, while in Belarusian and Ukrainian it is Іван.

It is the Slavic relative of the Latin name , corresponding to English John. This Slavic version of the name originates from New Testament Greek  (Iōánnēs) rather than from the Latin . The Greek name is in turn derived from Hebrew יוֹחָנָן, meaning "YHWH (God) is gracious". Common patronymics derived from the name are Ivanović (Serbian and Croatian), Ivanov (Russian and Bulgarian), and Ivanovich (Russian, used as middle name), corresponding to "Ivan's son".

Popularity
The name is common among Slovenes, Croats, Russians, Ukrainians, Bulgarians, Belarusians, Macedonians, Serbs, Bosnians, Montenegrins, and to a smaller extent Czechs and Slovaks.

Ivan is the most common male name in Bulgaria (as of 2013) and Croatia (as of 2013). In Serbia, it was the 9th most common male name in the period of 1971–1980; 6th in 1981–1990; 9th in 1991–2000.  It is also the 6th most common name in Slovenia.

In Croatia, with over thirty thousand namesakes, the name Ivan was the most popular between 1930 and 1940, and waned in popularity from 2003 to 2013. The name Ivan was the most common masculine given name until 1959, and between 1980 and 1999.

Since the 20th century, it is becoming more popular in the Romance-speaking world; Italian (both the original form and the italianized version, Ivano), Spanish (as Iván), and Portuguese (sometimes Ivã).

Ivan (pl. die Ivans) was also occasionally used by various parties during World War II as a general name for the Soviets.

Forms

Its female forms are Ivana (West and South Slavic) and Ivanna (East Slavic), while Ivanka and Iva are diminutives by origin. Slavic male diminutives (including historical) are Vanya or Vanja, Ivaniš, Ivanko, Ivanča, Ivanče, etc. A shorter form of the name is Ivo.

Notable people

Mononymously known as

Ivan (footballer, born 1984), Brazilian football player
Ivan (footballer, born 1997), Brazilian football player
Ivan (model) (Liera Manuel Ivan, born 1984), Japanese fashion model and musician
Iván (singer) (Juan Carlos Ramos Vaquero, born 1959 or 1962), Spanish singer
Ivan (Belarusian-Russian singer) (Alexander Ivanov), Belarusian-Russian singer
Ivan, German codename of Serbian spy Duško Popov

Royalty

Ivan Vladislav, Bulgarian emperor (1015–1018)
Ivan Asen I, Bulgarian emperor (1189–1196)
Kaloyan, Bulgarian emperor (1197–1207)
Ivan Asen II, Bulgarian emperor (1218–1241)
Ivan II, Bulgarian emperor (1298-1299)
Ivan Stephen, Bulgarian emperor (1330–1331)
Ivan Alexander, Bulgarian emperor (1331–1371)
Ivan Shishman, Bulgarian emperor in Tarnovo (1371–1395)
Ivan Stratsimir, Bulgarian emperor in Vidin (1356–1396)
Ivan I, "The Moneybag", Grand Duke of Moscow (1325–1340)
Ivan II, "The Fair", Grand Duke of Moscow (1353–1359)
Ivan III, "The Great", Grand Prince of Moscow (1462–1505)
Ivan IV, "The Terrible", Russian emperor (1547–1584)
Ivan V, Russian emperor (1682–1696)
Ivan VI, Russian emperor (1740–1741)

Nobility

 Ivanko, a Bulgarian boyar who killed Tsar Ivan Asen I in 1196
 John Horvat (Ivan Horvat, d. 1394), Hungarian-Croatian nobleman, Ban of Macsó (1376–1381, and 1385–1386)
 John of Palisna (Ivan od Paližne, d. 1391), Hungarian-Croatian nobleman, Ban of Croatia (1385–1386)
 Ivanko, a Bulgarian despot of the Despotate of Dobruja, ruled 1385-1399
 Ivan Bohun (died 1664), Cossack colonel
 Ivan Bot, Hungarian-Croatian nobleman, Ban of Croatia (1493)
 Ivan Mazepa, Hetman of Zaporizhian Host
 Ivan Mažuranić, Austro-Hungarian nobleman, Ban of Croatia (1873–1880), and poet
 Ivan Pidkova (died 1578), Cossack leader
 Ivan Sirko (c. 1610–1680), Cossack military leader
 Ivan Sulyma, Cossack leader

Clergy
Ivan Rilski (John of Rila), Bulgarian Orthodox hermit and patron saint (876 - 946)

Military 
Ivan Konev, a Russian/Soviet general
Ivan Mihailov, a Bulgarian revolutionary
Ivan Kolev, a Bulgarian general during First World War
Ivan Valkov, a Bulgarian general during First World War and later Minister of War

Sports

 Ivan Almeida (born 1989), Cape Verdean basketball player
Ivan Aska (born 1990), American basketball player in the Israeli National League
 Iván Campo (born 1974), Spanish footballer
 Ivan Cleary (born 1971), Australian Rugby League player and coach
 Iván Córdoba (born 1976), Colombian footballer
 Ivan Fedotov (born 1996), Russian ice hockey goaltender
 Iván González Ferreira (born 1987), Paraguayan footballer
 Iván Helguera (born 1975), Spanish footballer
 Iván Hurtado (born 1974), Ecuadorian footballer
 Ivan Lendl (born 1960), Czech-American tennis player
 Ivan Leshinsky (born 1947), American-Israeli basketball player
 Ivan Ljubičić (born 1979), Croatian tennis player
 Iban Mayo (born 1977), Spanish cyclist
 Ivan Miljković (born 1979), Serbian volleyball player
 Ivan Osiier (1888–1965), Danish épée, foil, and sabre fencer, 25x Danish champion
 Ivan Pace Jr. (born 2000), American football player
 Ivan Perišić (born 1989), Croatian footballer
 Ivan Pravilov (1963–2012), Ukrainian ice hockey coach charged with child molestation
 Ivan Rakitić (born 1988), Croatian soccer player
 Iván Rodríguez (born 1971), Major League Baseball player
 Ivan Rudež (born 1979), Croatian basketball coach
 Ivan Runje (born 1990), Croatian footballer
 Ivan Sproule (born 1981), Northern Irish footballer
 Ivan Toney (born 1996), English footballer
 Ivan Wilfred Johnson (1898–1979), Canadian hockey player
 Iván Zamorano (born 1967), Chilean footballer
 Iván Zarandona (born 1980), Equatoguinean footballer
 Ivan Zaytsev (disambiguation), several sportsmen
  Ivan Ivanov, Bulgarian footballer

Arts

 Ivan Barias, Dominican-American music producer and songwriter
 Ivan Brunetti (born 1967), cartoonist
 Ivan Bunin (1870–1953), Russian writer and Nobel laureate in literature
 Ivan Della Mea (1940–2009), Italian singer-songwriter
 Ivan Dixon (1931–2008), American actor, director and producer
 Ivan Doroschuk (born 1957), lead vocalist for Men Without Hats
 Ivan Dorschner (born 1990), Filipino-American actor, host and model
 Ivan Franko (1856–1916), Ukrainian writer
 Ivan (gorilla), painter
 Ivan Graziani (1945–1997), Italian singer-songwriter
 Ivan Jones, British Writer and poet
 Ivan Král (1948–2020), Czech-American musician
 Ivan Meštrović (1883–1962), Croatian sculptor and architect
 Van Morrison (George Ivan Morrison, born 1945), Northern Irish singer-songwriter and musician
 Ivan Moody (born 1980), singer of heavy metal band Five Finger Death Punch
 Ivan Ozhogin(born 1978), Russian singer and actor
 Ivan Reitman (1946–2022), Czechoslovak-born Canadian film and television director, producer and screenwriter
 Ivan Šijak (born 1969), Serbian visual artist, professor, director, and cinematographer
 Ivan Turgenev (1818–1893), Russian novelist
 Ivan Urgant (born 1978), Russian television personality, presenter, actor and musician
 Ivan Vazov (1850 – 1921), Bulgarian poet, novelist and playwright, often referred to as "the Patriarch of Bulgarian literature"
 Ivan Shishmanov (1862 – 1928), Bulgarian writer, ethnographer, politician and diplomat

Science, academia, business and other

 Ivan Aboimov (born 1936), Russian diplomat and ambassador
 Ivan Agayants (1911–1968), Soviet intelligence officer of Armenian origin
 Ivan Ahčin (1897–1960), Slovene sociologist, publicist, journalist, author, and politician
 Ivan Aksakov (1823–1886), Russian littérateur and notable Slavophile
 Ivan Benediktov (1902–1983), Soviet politician 
 Ivan Boesky (born 1937), Wall Street trader who inspired the character of Gordon Gekko in the film Wall Street.
 Ivan Chermayeff, graphic designer
 Ivan Corea, Sri Lankan Anglican priest
 Iván Duque Márquez (born 1976), President of Colombia
 Ivan Fadeev (1906–1976), Soviet economist and politician
 Ivan Gazidis (born 1964), chief executive of the AC Milan
 Ivan Glasenberg (born 1957), CEO of Glencore, director of Xstrata and Minara Resources
 Ivan Greenberg (1896–1966), English journalist
 Ivan Ilyin (1883–1954), Russian religious and political philosopher
 Ivan Knotek (1936–2020), Slovak politician
 Ivan Massow (born 1967), chairman of the Institute of Contemporary Arts
 Ivan Menezes (born 1959), CEO of Diageo, non-executive director at Coach, Inc.
 Ivan Misner, chairman of BNI
 Ivan Milat, Croatian Australian serial killer famous for the backpacker killings
 Ivan Vsevolodovich Meshcherskiy (1859–1935), Russian mathematician
 Ivan J. Parron, entertainment attorney and entrepreneur
 Ivan Pavlov (1849–1946), Russian physiologist and Nobel laureate in Medicine & Physiology
 Ivan Rogers (born 1960), British civil servant, former Permanent Representative of the United Kingdom to the European Union
 Ivan Samoylovych (died 1690), Hetman of Left-bank Ukraine
 Ivan Seidenberg (born 1946), chairman & CEO at Verizon Communications
 Ivan Selin (born 1937), former chairman of the Nuclear Regulatory Commission, Fulbright scholar
 Ivan Semwanga, Ugandan-born South African philanthropist
 Ivan Vasyunyk (born 1959), Ukrainian politician
 Ivan Warner (1919–1994), New York politician and judge
 Ivan Wettengel (1876–1935), Naval Governor of Guam
 Ivan Kostov (born 1949), 47th Prime Minister of Bulgaria
 Ivan Evstratiev Geshov (1849 - 1924), 18th Prime Minister of Bulgaria

Other notable people with the given name "Ivan"

Fiction 
 Ivan Braginsky, the given name for the national personification of Russia from the anime series Hetalia: Axis Powers
 Ivan, a secondary character of Foster's Home for Imaginary Friends
 Ivan the Fool, a character of the eponymous story
 Ivan Vanko, an antagonist from the Marvel Comics franchise The Invincible Iron Man who appears as the primary antagonist in the sequel to the film adaptation
 Ivan Denisovich Shukhov, a character of One Day in the Life of Ivan Denisovich
 Ivan, a Nintendo character in the Golden Sun series
 Ivan, a Nintendo character in Devil's Third and Pokémon series
 Ivan, a Nintendo character in New game Action in 2019
 Ivan Vassilevich Lomov, a character in Anton Chekhov's one-act play, A Marriage Proposal
 Ivan Raidenovich Raikov, a character in video game Metal Gear Solid 3: Snake Eater
 Ivan Ilych, the title character of Leo Tolstoy's book, The Death of Ivan Ilyich
 Ivan Karamazov, brother of protagonist Alyosha Karamazov, in Fyodor Dostoevsky's novel, The Brothers Karamazov
 Ivan, in the 2006 film Curious George
 Ivan Veen, in Vladimir Nabokov's Ada or Ardor
 Ivan Drago, in Rocky IV
 Ivan Nikolayevich Ponyryov (Bezdomny), in Mikhail Bulgakov's novel, The Master and Margarita
 Ivan Shawbly, from the television series Mona the Vampire
 Ivan Ooze, the villain in Mighty Morphin Power Rangers: The Movie
 Sir Ivan of Zandar, the Gold Ranger in Power Rangers Dino Charge and Power Rangers Dino Super Charge
 Ivanhoe, an 1820 novel by Sir Walter Scott
Ivan, a Western lowland Gorilla, the star and basis of the 2012 K.A. Applegate novel The One and Only Ivan and its film adaptation.
Ivan Bruel, in the animated series Miraculous: Tales of Ladybug and Cat Noir

References

Slavic masculine given names
Bosnian masculine given names
Bulgarian masculine given names
Croatian masculine given names
Czech masculine given names
Macedonian masculine given names
Russian masculine given names
Serbian masculine given names
Slovene masculine given names
Slovak masculine given names
Ukrainian masculine given names